Akışına Bırak (Let It Go) is the fourth studio album released in June 2000 by the Turkish pop singer Mustafa Sandal. This album is not a pop music album in fact, it has classical art songs such as "Alkışlarla", "Mesela" and "Akışına Bırak". With these songs Mustafa Sandal showed he can make classical world music too.

Track listing

Credits
 Music direction, arrangements: Mustafa Sandal, İskender Paydaş, Volga Tamöz
 Mixing: Deneb Pinjo, Bülent Tezcan, İskender Paydaş, Suat Yılmaz, Tarık Ceran
 Publisher: Prestij Müzik
 Photography: Nihat Odabaşı

Music videos
 "Tek Geçerim": 12 June 2000
 "Hatırla Beni (Duet Natalia)": 14 September 2000
 "Geriye Dönmem": 20 November 2000

Notes 

Mustafa Sandal albums
2000 albums